The 2010 Kuwaiti Crown Prince Cup is a cup competition involving teams from the Kuwaiti Premier League and the Kuwaiti Division One league. It has been moved from its regular slot at the end of the domestic league campaigns and into the midseason domestic league break.

The 2010 edition is the 17th edition to be held.

First round

12 teams play a knockout tie. 6 clubs advance to the next round. Games played between 6 March and 7 March.

Quarter-finals

8 teams play a knockout tie. 4 clubs advance to the next round.

Semi-finals

4 teams play a knockout tie. Winners advance to the final

Final

Kuwait Crown Prince Cup
2009–10 in Kuwaiti football
2009–10 domestic association football cups